The 2019 Arkansas Razorbacks women's soccer team represents the University of Arkansas during the 2019 NCAA Division I women's soccer season. This season is the 34th in program history. The Razorbacks play their home games at Razorback Field in Fayetteville and are led by eighth-year head coach Colby Hale.

Previous season

In 2018, the Razorbacks finished the regular season 11–4–3, 6–3–1 in SEC play, and were seeded fourth in the SEC Tournament, where they defeated 5-seed Ole Miss and 8-seed Florida en route to the championship game, where they fell in penalties to 7-seed LSU. The Razorbacks were selected as an at-large bid to the NCAA Tournament, where they defeated Little Rock in the first round of the North Carolina bracket before being defeated in extra time by Virginia Tech. The Hogs finished their season with a record of 14–6–3.

Personnel

Roster

Coaching staff

Schedule
Source:

|-
!colspan=8 style=""| Fall exhibition

|-
!colspan=8 style=""| Non-conference regular season

|-
!colspan=8 style=""| SEC regular season

|-
!colspan=8 style=""| SEC tournament

|-
!colspan=8 style=""| NCAA tournament

Ranking movements

References

Arkansas
Arkansas Razorbacks women's soccer seasons
Arkansas Razorbacks soccer, women's